Calvi is an Italian surname. Notable people with the surname include:
 Michelangelo Calvi, American artist 
 Alessandro Calvi, Italian swimmer
 Anna Calvi, English musician
 Gérard Calvi, French composer
 Jacopo Alessandro Calvi (1740-1815), Italian painter
 Lazzaro Calvi, Italian painter
 Mark Calvi (born 1969), American college baseball coach
 Mary Calvi, American journalist
 Pino Calvi, Italian pianist and composer 
 Roberto Calvi, Italian banker
 Yves Calvi, French journalist

Italian-language surnames